Michael Geoffrey Ipgrave  (born 18 April 1958) is a British Anglican bishop. Since 2016, he has been the 99th Bishop of Lichfield, the diocesan bishop of the Diocese of Lichfield. He was the Bishop of Woolwich, an area bishop in the Diocese of Southwark, from 2012 to 2016. He served as Archdeacon of Southwark between 2004 and 2012.

Early life and education
Ipgrave was born on 18 April 1958 in Northampton, Northamptonshire, United Kingdom. He was educated at Magdalen College School, Brackley, a state school in South Northamptonshire. From 1975 to 1978, he studied mathematics at Oriel College, Oxford, and graduated from the University of Oxford with a first class Bachelor of Arts (BA) degree.

From 1979 to 1980, he attended the Spring Hill Ordination Scheme in Birmingham. From 1979 to 1982, he trained for ordination at Ripon College Cuddesdon, an Anglican theological college near Oxford. During that period he also studied theology at the University of Oxford, and graduated with an additional first class BA. In 1999 Ipgrave completed a doctorate at Durham University with a thesis entitled Trinity and inter-faith dialogue: plenitude and plurality.

Ordained ministry
Ipgrave was ordained in the Church of England: made a deacon at Petertide 1982 (27 June) and ordained a priest in the Petertide following (26 June 1983)  both times by Douglas Feaver, Bishop of Peterborough, at Peterborough Cathedral. After a curacy in Oakham followed by time in Japan, he was a team vicar in two separate Leicester parishes.

In Leicester, in 1991, he was appointed diocesan chaplain for relations with people of other faiths, and bishops' domestic chaplain in 1992. He was appointed Archdeacon of Southwark in 2004. In 2010 he also became Canon Missioner of Southwark Cathedral. He was co-chair of Southwark and London Housing Association (now Amicus Horizon)

He was formerly Inter Faith Relations Advisor to the Archbishops' Council and secretary of the Churches' Commission on Inter-Faith Relations.

Episcopal ministry
On 3 February 2012, Ipgrave was announced as the next Bishop of Woolwich, an area bishop in the Diocese of Southwark. On 21 March 2012, he was consecrated a bishop, by Rowan Williams, Archbishop of Canterbury, during a service in Southwark Cathedral. He also served as Warden of Readers for the diocese. In May 2013, he read bidding prayers at a Mass for Lee Rigby who was murdered by Islamists in the 2013 Woolwich attack.

Since February 2015 Ipgrave has been chair of the Council of Christians and Jews (CCJ). On 2 March 2016, it was announced that he was to become the next diocesan Bishop of Lichfield. His canonical election to that See was confirmed on 10 June 2016; his installation at Lichfield Cathedral took place on 24 September 2016.

He became a member of the House of Lords (as a Lord Spiritual) on 25 October 2022; he was introduced on 20 February 2023.

Personal life
In 1981, Ipgrave married Julia Bailey. Together they have raised three children.

Honours
In the 2011 New Year Honours, Ipgrave was appointed an Officer of the Order of the British Empire (OBE) "for services to inter-faith relations in London".

Selected works
He has edited six volumes on Christian and Muslim relations.  He is author of Trinity and Inter Faith Dialogue, and has contributed to journal articles and book chapters on inter-faith matters.

References

External links
 Interviewed on ANN TV 2015

Archdeacons of Southwark
Bishops of Woolwich
Officers of the Order of the British Empire
Anglo-Catholic bishops
Lords Spiritual
1958 births
Living people
People educated at Magdalen College School, Brackley
Alumni of St Chad's College, Durham
Alumni of Oriel College, Oxford
Bishops of Lichfield